U.S. Route 80 (US 80) is a  U.S. Highway in the U.S. state of Georgia. It travels west-to-east from the Alabama state line in Columbus across the central portion of the state through cities such as Macon, Dublin, Statesboro, and Savannah to connect to its eastern terminus at an intersection with Tybrisa Street and Inlet Avenue in Tybee Island, near the Atlantic Ocean. Here, the roadway continues as Butler Avenue. US-80 is the main east-west non-Interstate route through Georgia.

In Georgia, all U.S. Highways have at least one state highway that travel concurrently along its route. The main ones that US 80 use are SR 540 from the Alabama state line to Geneva and in the eastern part of the Macon metropolitan area; SR 22 from the Alabama state line to Macon; SR 19 from Macon to a point southeast of Montrose; and SR 26 from that point to Tybee Island.  From Macon to its Savannah, US 80 roughly parallels I-16, taking a more circuitous route to pass through the center several small towns that I-16 bypasses.

Route description
The highway crosses the Chattahoochee River from Alabama into Columbus where it proceeds along J. R. Allen Parkway through the northern section of the city as a limited-access freeway. Past Columbus, the road meanders through rural Georgia for roughly  en route to Macon where it becomes the Eisenhower Parkway, so named in 1969 after the death of Dwight Eisenhower, and crosses Interstate 475 (I-475) and then I-75 before traveling through downtown Macon and merging with US 129/US 41 Bus. in a concurrency. The concurrency with US 41 Bus. ends at Walnut Street, and the one with US 129 ends at Riverside Drive. After crossing the Otis Redding Memorial Bridge over the Ocmulgee River, it has another interchange, this time with I-16. The highway joins southbound US 23/US 129 Alt. and parallels the northern boundary of Ocmulgee Mounds National Historical Park just east of the city.

Beyond Macon, the highway turns southeastward, traveling through the cities of Dublin, where it encircles the Laurens County Courthouse. Before the highway leaves Dublin, it is joined by US 319/SR 31, where all four highways cross the Herschel Lovett Bridge over the Oconee River, entering East Dublin, where US 319/SR 31 leaves to the northeast. Later it enters Swainsboro, where it is concurrent with SR 56, and Statesboro where it is concurrent with US 25, and traveling roughly parallel to I-16. On the outskirts of Savannah, the highway crosses I-95 and follows Louisville Road into the city's downtown area. After briefly merging with I-516, US 80 continues eastward along Victory Drive, just south of Savannah's historic district. At the community of Thunderbolt, where Victory Drive ends, US 80 crosses the Wilmington River and proceeds across the islands and marshes along the Atlantic Coast east of Savannah. There it crosses Lazaretto Creek onto Tybee Island. The final stretch of US 80 follows Butler Avenue across Tybee Island. The highway terminates at 19th Street, a few hundred feet from the ocean. A small monument at the intersection of Butler and Tybrisa Street marks the end of the highway.

The following portions of US 80 in Georgia are part of the National Highway System, a system of routes determined to be the most important for the nation's economy, mobility, and defense:
From the Alabama state line to the SR 96 intersection in Geneva
From the I-475 interchange to the southern end of the US 129 concurrency in Macon
From the northern end of the US 129 concurrency in Macon to the SR 57 intersection in East Macon
The portion between US 441 Byp./SR 117 and US 441/SR 29 in Dublin
From the western end of the US 25/SR 67 concurrency in Hopeulikit to the US 301 Byp./SR 73 Byp. intersection in Statesboro
From the I-95 interchange in Pooler to an indeterminate point in Tybee Island.

History
In 2017, it was planned to extended Jimmy DeLoach Parkway from its current southern terminus at US 80/SR 17/SR 26, partially along the path of Bloomingdale Road (from SR 17's current southern terminus at I-16 to just south of its intersection with the northern terminus of Pine Barren Road). Construction on the extension began in 2018.

Future
Part of US 80 from the Alabama state line to Geneva, Georgia is part of the Fall Line Freeway, a highway that connects Columbus and Augusta. This portion may eventually be incorporated into the proposed eastern extension of Interstate 14 (I-14), which is currently entirely within Central Texas and may be extended into Augusta. 

The at-grade intersection at Jimmy DeLoach Parkway's current southern terminus is to be converted into a full diamond interchange. The extension of the parkway is planned to be designated as SR 1251 until it is opened. The former alignment of SR 17 is planned to be redesignated as SR 17 Conn. Also, the eastern end of Osteen Road, which lies on the right-of-way of the extension, is to be shifted to the west.

Major intersections

See also

References

External links

Georgia @ SouthEastRoads - U.S. Highway 80
Fall Line Freeway - GA DOT Project FLF-540 (Georgia Highways)

 Georgia
80
Transportation in Muscogee County, Georgia
Transportation in Talbot County, Georgia
Transportation in Taylor County, Georgia
Transportation in Upson County, Georgia
Transportation in Crawford County, Georgia
Transportation in Bibb County, Georgia
Transportation in Macon, Georgia
Transportation in Twiggs County, Georgia
Transportation in Laurens County, Georgia
Transportation in Johnson County, Georgia
Transportation in Emanuel County, Georgia
Transportation in Bulloch County, Georgia
Transportation in Bryan County, Georgia
Transportation in Effingham County, Georgia
Transportation in Chatham County, Georgia
Roads in Savannah, Georgia